Rainer Schmidt-Ruthenbeck (also spelled Reiner, born 1941) is a German billionaire businessman and, together with his brother Michael, owner of 16% of the retail group Metro AG.

Biography 
He is the son of Wilhelm Schmidt-Ruthenbeck and Vera Ruthenbeck. His brother is Michael Schmidt-Ruthenbeck and his sister is Viola Schmidt-Ruthenbeck.

On the Forbes 2016 list of the world's billionaires, he and his brother were ranked #722 with a net worth of US$2.4 billion.

He lives in Duisburg, Germany.

References 

1941 births
Living people
Businesspeople from North Rhine-Westphalia
German businesspeople in retailing
20th-century German businesspeople
21st-century German businesspeople
German billionaires
Metro Group people
People from Duisburg